Plaza Galerias Pachuca is a two-story shopping mall in the city of Pachuca, capital of the state of Hidalgo, Mexico.

References
  Mall's official website
Picture of the Liverpool Store
Zona Plateada de Pachuca Website
Cinepolis Cinemas website on Pachuca Galerias Mall
CineSonido's Website which features a story about the movie complex has a picture of the Cinepolis complex in Galerias
Helados Santa Clara which has a picture of their 2 level ice cream shop
Website with the information about the Crowne Plaza Hotel in Zona Plateada

Shopping malls in Mexico